The Hartwell B. Hyde House, also known as Solitude, is a property in Triune, Tennessee that was listed on the National Register of Historic Places (NRHP) in 1988.

Hartwell Hyde was an early settler of the Triune area.  He and William Jordan arrived in 1810;  Jordan's log home is the location of the Newton Jordan House, also NRHP-listed.

The Hyde House was an early plantation homes and had a flour mill and a cotton gin on the property.  The Hyde plantation, with 900 acres, when owned by Mrs. E.B. Hyde, was one of a number of "productive and prosperous" antebellum plantations in the county.  

The Hyde House  includes Double pen, dog trot, and Italianate architecture.

References

Houses on the National Register of Historic Places in Tennessee
Houses in Williamson County, Tennessee
Italianate architecture in Tennessee
Double pen architecture in Tennessee
Dogtrot architecture in Tennessee
Houses completed in 1801
National Register of Historic Places in Williamson County, Tennessee